Banswara State was located in what is today the state of Rajasthan. The rulers belonged to the Sisodia clan.

History
After the death of Rawal Udai Singh of Vagad at the Battle of Khanwa in 1527, where he fought alongside Rana Sanga against Babar, his territories were divided into the states of Dungarpur State and Banswara State. Banswarra was given to Jagmal Singh who became its first ruler.

See also
 List of Rajput dynasties and states
 Mewar Residency
 Mughal Empire
 Maratha Empire
 Rajputana

References

External links
Indian Princely States – CRW Flags Inc. – Banswara

Princely states of Rajasthan
Banswara district
1527 establishments in India
1949 disestablishments in India
States and territories established in 1497
States and territories disestablished in 1949
Former protectorates
Former monarchies of South Asia
Former countries in South Asia
Rajputs